The Keio Unicorns football program represents the Keio University in college football. They are members of the Kantoh Collegiate American Football Association. They are coached by David Stant.

References

External links
 

American football teams established in 1935
American football in Japan
1935 establishments in Japan